Pristurus carteri, commonly known as Carter's rock gecko or Carter's semaphore gecko, is a species of gecko, a lizard in the family Sphaerodactylidae. The species is endemic to the Sinai Peninsula.

Etymology
The generic name, Pristurus, means "saw-tailed" in Latin.

The specific name, carteri, is in honor of Dr. Henry Carter who collected the holotype.

Subspecies
There are two subspecies of Pristurus carteri.  The first is the nominotypical subspecies, Pristurus carteri carteri (Gray, 1863), and the other is Pristurus carteri tuberculatus Parker, 1931,  P. c. carteri being the more common.

Common names
The species P. carteri has many common names such as Carter's rock gecko, ornate rock gecko, and scorpion-tailed gecko.

Geographic range and habitat
P. carteri is native to Oman, Saudi Arabia, United Arab Emirates, and Yemen, where it often is found basking on rocks or in urban areas.

Behavior
P. carteri are often seen swaying their curly tails back and forth to each other in a way to sort of communicate to each other.  The males develop little fleshy spikes on their tails upon reaching sexual maturity.  When they feel threatened they curl their tails in a scorpion-like fashion and even mimic the movements a scorpion will use as a threat display; this and the tail waving are the source of the common name scorpion-tailed geckos.

Members of the genus Pristurus are diurnal.  This is unusual in geckos except in the genera Phelsuma, Lygodactylus, Naultinus, Quedenfeldtia, Rhoptropus, all Sphaerodactylids, and, of course, Pristurus.

Description

Reproduction
P. carteri reaches sexual maturity in roughly 10 months. Adult females lay 1–2 hard shelled eggs that are incubated at 28 °C (82.4 °F) for 70–90 days.

References

Further reading
Boulenger GA (1885). Catalogue of the Lizards in the British Museum (Natural History). Second Edition. Volume I. Geckonidæ ... London: Trustees of the British Museum (Natural History). (Taylor and Francis, printers). xii + 436 pp. + Plates I-XXXII. (Pristurus carteri, pp. 55–56).
Gray JE (1863). "Description of a New Lizard obtained by Mr. Henry Carter on the South-east Coast of Arabia". Proc. Zool. Soc. London 1863: 236-237 + Plate XX, figure 2. (Spatalura carteri, new species).
Parker HW (1931). "Some Reptiles and Amphibians from S.E. Arabia". Ann. Mag. Nat. Hist., Tenth Series 8: 514–522. (Pristurus carteri tuberculatus, new subspecies).

Pristurus
Reptiles described in 1863
Taxa named by John Edward Gray